Araku  Lok Sabha constituency is one of the twenty-five lok sabha constituencies of Andhra Pradesh in India. As per the Delimitation of Parliamentary and Assembly Constituencies Order (2008), it was formed as a reserved constituency for the Scheduled tribes, comprising seven assembly segments and belongs to Alluri Sitharama Raju district and Parvathipuram Manyam district s .

Assembly Segments 

The seven Assembly segments of Araku Lok Sabha constituency are:

Members of Parliament
To see before election data Parvathipuram Lok Sabha constituency

Election results

General Election 2019

General Election 2014

General Election 2009

See also 
 List of constituencies of the Andhra Pradesh Legislative Assembly

References

External links 
Araku lok sabha constituency election 2019 date and schedule

Lok Sabha constituencies in Andhra Pradesh
Geography of Visakhapatnam district
Vizianagaram district